Griesedieck Brothers Beer is a historic St. Louis beer brand that has been reintroduced after years of absence.  The Griesedieck family once owned three St. Louis-area breweries, Griesedieck Brothers Brewery, Griesedieck Western Brewery Co. in Belleville, Illinois (producers of Stag Beer) and the Falstaff Brewing Corporation, producer of Falstaff Beer.

Family brewing tradition 
German immigrant Anton Griesedieck brought his family brewing tradition (dating from 1766 in Stromberg, Germany) to St. Louis in about 1866.  He owned a series of breweries, employing his four sons, including Henry Jr. and Joseph "Papa Joe", and nephew Henry L. Griesedieck, who would later found Griesedieck Western Brewery Co.  The four sons established the National Brewery Co. in 1891, which later became part of the Independent Breweries Company in 1907.  Henry Jr. ran IBC for four years until he quit to help his five sons Anton, Henry, Raymond, Edward and Robert found Griesedieck Brothers Brewery Co. in 1911.  GB made non-alcoholic beer and soft drinks during Prohibition but closed its doors by 1920.  For the next 13 years, the Griesedieck Brothers would anxiously bide their time before they could once again brew what would become the most popular beer in St. Louis.

Post-Prohibition 

After prohibition ended, the heirs of Henry Jr. kept Griesedieck Brothers while the heirs of Papa Joe ran Falstaff.  Starting in 1947, Griesedieck Brothers sponsored the St. Louis Cardinals radio broadcasts with Harry Caray until the Anheuser-Busch brewery bought the team in 1953.  Shortly after Anheuser-Busch bought the team, it renamed Sportsman's Park as Busch Stadium and introduced Busch Beer.  This new beer was sold at new low prices and significantly dug into Griesedieck Brothers sales.

When Edward Griesedieck, the last remaining original Griesedieck Brother, died in 1955, the company looked at its options. In 1957 Griesedieck Brothers was sold to its cousins at Falstaff, and production under the GB name stopped almost overnight. The Griesedieck brewery, at that point, was the most updated brewery in the nation, with production over 1,000,000 barrels per year. Falstaff thus moved all production into the former GB plant.

Falstaff's peak production year was 1966 at 6,000,000 barrels, declining thereafter.  When Falstaff got hit with court costs involving the acquisition of Narragansett beer, the company had to sell.  Paul Kalmanovitz purchased the company in 1975 and moved the headquarters to California.  By 1977, the old GB plant was closed down.  Through various mergers and acquisitions, Pabst Brewing Company eventually acquired the Falstaff brand but quit production in 2005.

Present-day 
Family descendant Raymond A. Griesedieck, son of Henry A. Griesedieck (the last president of the original Griesedieck Brothers), incorporated the new Griesedieck Brothers Brewery Company in 1992.  By 2002, Griesedieck Brothers Beer re-emerged in the St. Louis beer market.

Raymond A. Griesedieck owns the GB shield and Griesedieck Bros. trademarks.  Griesedieck Brothers Brewery has provided to various local establishments in the St. Louis area since 2002.

The original Griesedieck Beer was a classic American lager.  The current incarnations include Golden Pilsner (a German pilsner beer) and Unfiltered Bavarian-Style Wheat (a German hefeweizen).

References

St. Louis Post-Dispatch, July 14, 2006, page. B1.

External links
History of Falstaff https://web.archive.org/web/20080503181624/http://www.falstaffbrewing.com/interest.htm
Griesedieck Brothers - Our Story http://gb-beer.com/our-story.shtml

Pabst Brewing Company
Beer brewing companies based in St. Louis
German-American culture in St. Louis
Cuisine of St. Louis
Falstaff Brewing Corporation